Devin L. Dodson (born March 15, 1999) is an American professional stock car racing driver. He last competed part-time in the ARCA Menards Series West, driving the No. 7 Ford Fusion for JP Racing.

Racing career
Dodson started his career in go-kart racing before moving up to dirt modifieds at the age of 14. A few years later, he stopped racing around his Maryland home and traveled to North Carolina and South Carolina to compete in late model racing. While racing late models, Dodson signed a driver development deal with Empire Racing Group, a satellite team of Richard Petty Motorsports.

In 2018, Dodson stepped up to regional touring series, competing with Jefferson Pitts Racing for a limited schedule in the NASCAR K&N Pro Series West. The choice to travel to the West Coast and race with JPR was based on the value per start with Dodson not having major corporate backing.

In May 2019, Dodson joined Vizion Motorsports for his ARCA Menards Series debut at Charlotte Motor Speedway. On July 26, 2019, it was announced that Dodson was scheduled to make his NASCAR national series debut driving the No. 32 for Reaume Brothers Racing in the NASCAR Gander Outdoors Truck Series in the 2019 Eldora Dirt Derby, with the potential to add more races with the team later in 2019. The announcement came after an opportunity with a different team fell through.

Personal life
Dodson graduated from Stephen Decatur High School.

Motorsports career results

NASCAR
(key) (Bold – Pole position awarded by qualifying time. Italics – Pole position earned by points standings or practice time. * – Most laps led.)

Gander Outdoors Truck Series

K&N Pro Series East

ARCA Menards Series 
(key) (Bold – Pole position awarded by qualifying time. Italics – Pole position earned by points standings or practice time. * – Most laps led.)

ARCA Menards Series West

References

External links
 

Living people
1999 births
Racing drivers from Maryland
People from Ocean City, Maryland
NASCAR drivers
ARCA Menards Series drivers